Riqueti is a surname. Notable people with the surname include:

André Boniface Louis de Riquetti, vicomte de Mirabeau (1754–1792), one of the reactionary leaders at the opening of the French Revolution
Honoré Gabriel Riqueti, comte de Mirabeau (1749–1791), French writer, popular orator and statesman
Joseph Shalit Riqueti, Jewish-Italian scholar born at Safed, who directed a Talmudical school in Verona
Sibylle Gabrielle Marie Antoinette Riqueti de Mirabeau (1849–1932), French writer who wrote under the pseudonym GYP
Victor de Riqueti, marquis de Mirabeau (1715–1789), French economist of the Physiocratic school

French-language surnames